Samar Sen (10 August 1914  16 February 2003) was an Indian diplomat who served as the 1st permanent representative of India to the United Nations, Geneva, 8th in New York and the 2nd high commissioner of India to Bangladesh from June 1974 to November 1976.

Born in Dhaka, British India (in modern-day Dhaka, Bangladesh), Sen obtained his education from the University of Calcutta, the University of London, Oxford, and Lincoln's Inn. He was a civil services officer who served as a president of the United Nations Security Council from 1972 to 73.

Career 
Sen served in the government of India at various posts, including under secretary, and deputy secretary. From 1946 to 48, he represented India at the United Nations as a liaison officer. He also served as chairperson of the International Commission of Control and Supervision besides serving as ambassador to Algeria and Lebanon, and high commissioner to Australia, New Zealand, and Pakistan. At the government of India, he also served as joint secretary in the Ministry of External Affairs from 1957 to 1959.

During his foreign services, he served as president of the United Nations Administrative Tribunal and chairperson of the G77.

Assassination attempt 
Following the Bangladesh Liberation War and assassination of Sheikh Mujibur Rahman, he was reportedly a target of an assassination attempt in November 1975. He received several injuries and then remained India's high commissioner for the next year until he was appointed as high commissioner to Pakistan.

He suffered broken shoulder bone, but bullet was removed after a surgery in Dhaka hospital. During retaliation his security guards killed four of the six attackers. The attackers posed his visitors in a civilian clothes. He was brought to India by an Indian Air Force plan, although he remained India's high commissioner for the next year after he survived alleged assassination.

References

Further reading 
 
 
 
 
 
 
 

1914 births
2003 deaths
Permanent Representatives of India to the United Nations
High Commissioners of India to Bangladesh
High Commissioners of India to Pakistan
High Commissioners of India to New Zealand
High Commissioners of India to Australia
Ambassadors of India to Algeria
Ambassadors of India to Lebanon